Ashley John Gardiner (10 December 1946 – 18 January 2021) was a New Zealand rugby union player. A prop, Gardiner represented Taranaki at a provincial level, and was a member of the New Zealand national side, the All Blacks, in 1974 on the tours of Australia and Ireland. He played 11 matches for the All Blacks including one international.

Gardiner died in New Plymouth on 18 January 2021.

References

1946 births
2021 deaths
Rugby union players from New Plymouth
People educated at New Plymouth Boys' High School
New Zealand rugby union players
New Zealand international rugby union players
Taranaki rugby union players
Rugby union props